Andy Awazi A. Kawaya Kinghi Mwana Mufula (born 23 August 1996), known as Andy Kawaya, is a Belgian footballer who plays as a left winger at the Cultural y Deportiva Leonesa

Club career
Kawaya is a youth exponent from Anderlecht. He made his first team debut at 25 September 2013 in the Belgian Cup against K.A.S. Eupen. At 4 November 2014, he made his UEFA Champions League debut against Arsenal. After making 28 appearances and scoring 4 goals in all competitions for Anderlecht, Kawaya moved out on loan on 7 January 2016 to join Eredivisie side Willem II for the rest of the 2015–16 season.

On 29 January 2019, Kawaya signed a contract for the rest of the season with Spanish club Cultural Leonesa. On 17 June 2021, he moved to Segunda División side FC Cartagena on a two-year deal, but terminated his contract the following 31 January after appearing rarely.

On 31 January 2022, Kawaya signed a two-and-a-half-year contract with Albacete Balompié in Primera División RFEF. After helping the club in their promotion to the second division, he terminated his contract exactly one year later.

Career statistics

Club

Honours
Kawaya won his first honour in his career when he and Anderlecht won the 2013–14 Belgian Pro League. His second honour came in the subsequent 2014 Belgian Super Cup.

Collective
Anderlecht
Belgian Pro League (1): 2013–14
Belgian Super Cup (1): 2014

References

External links

1996 births
Living people
Belgian footballers
R.S.C. Anderlecht players
Willem II (football club) players
K.V. Mechelen players
U.S. Avellino 1912 players
Cultural Leonesa footballers
FC Cartagena footballers
Albacete Balompié players
Belgian Pro League players
Eredivisie players
Segunda División players
Primera Federación players
Segunda División B players
Belgium youth international footballers
Belgium under-21 international footballers
Belgian expatriate footballers
Expatriate footballers in Italy
Expatriate footballers in the Netherlands
Expatriate footballers in Spain
Belgian sportspeople of Democratic Republic of the Congo descent
Footballers from Brussels
Association football midfielders